The Boomtown Rats is the debut album by Irish rock band The Boomtown Rats, released in September 1977. It included the Rats' first hit single, "Lookin' After No. 1", as well as the subsequent single, "Mary of the 4th Form". The album peaked at No. 18 in the UK Albums Chart in 1977.

Track listing (1977 LP)
All lyrics written by Bob Geldof, all music arranged by The Boomtown Rats
 "Lookin' After No. 1"
 "Neon Heart"
 "Joey's on the Street Again"
 "Never Bite the Hand That Feeds"
 "Mary of the 4th Form"
 "(She's Gonna) Do You In"
 "Close As You'll Ever Be"
 "I Can Make It If You Can"
 "Kicks"

Track listing (2005 CD reissue)
 "Lookin' After No. 1" 
 "Mary of the 4th Form"
 "Close As You'll Ever Be"
 "Neon Heart"
 "Joey's On the Streets Again"
 "I Can Make It If You Can"
 "Never Bite The Hand That Feeds"
 "(She's Gonna) Do You In"
 "Kicks"

Bonus Tracks
 "Doin' It Right" - 1975 Live Demo
 "My Blues Away" - 1975 Live Demo
 "A Second Time" - 1975 Live Demo
 "Fanzine Hero" - 1975 Live Demo
 "Barefootin'" - Live at Moran's Hotel, Dublin, 1975
 "Mary of the 4th Form" - Single Version

Personnel
Credits adapted from album liner notes.

The Boomtown Rats
 Bob Geldof – lead vocals, harmonica
 Garry Roberts – guitar, backing vocals
 Gerry Cott – guitar
 Johnnie Fingers – keyboards, backing vocals
 Pete Briquette – bass, backing vocals
 Simon Crowe – drums, backing vocals

Additional musicians
 Albie Donnelly – saxophone

Technical
 Adrian Boot – photography
 Steve Brown – editing, engineering, mastering, mixing
 Sue Dubois – art direction, design
 Geoff Halpin – design
 Robert John "Mutt" Lange – mixing, production
 Hannah Sharn – photography

Charts

Certifications

References

1977 debut albums
The Boomtown Rats albums
Albums produced by Robert John "Mutt" Lange